Kalashniki is a rural locality (a selo) in Kalashnikovskoye Rural Settlement, Pallasovsky District, Volgograd Oblast, Russia. The population was 143 as of 2010. There are 6 streets.

Geography 
Kalashniki is located in steppe, 23 km southwest of Pallasovka (the district's administrative centre) by road. Khudushny is the nearest rural locality.

References 

Rural localities in Pallasovsky District